The bulldog catshark (Apristurus pinguis) is a catshark of the family Scyliorhinidae, found in the deep waters of the East China Sea and in the Northwest Pacific. In New Zealand waters it is found at the Reinga Ridge, the West Norfolk Ridge, the Hikurangi Trough and the Chatham Rise as well as on the Campbell Plateau.

Description 
The overall colouration of this species is brown or a brownish shade with its palate and tongue being dark. Its length is up to 83.5 cm.

Conservation status 
The New Zealand Department of Conservation has classified the flaccid catshark as "Data deficient" under the New Zealand Threat Classification System.

References

External links

bulldog catshark
Marine fauna of East Asia
Taxa named by Deng Si-Ming
Taxa named by Zhan Hong-Xi
bulldog catshark